Diving competitions at the 2021 Junior Pan American Games in Cali, Colombia, were held at the Hernando Botero O'byrne Swimming Pools.

7 medal events were contested.

Medal table

Medallists

Men

Women

Mixed

References

External links
Diving at the 2021 Junior Pan American Games

Junior Pan American Games
Events at the 2021 Junior Pan American Games
Qualification tournaments for the 2023 Pan American Games